Faiz Yakub Fazal (born 7 September 1985) is an Indian cricketer who plays for the Vidarbha cricket team and Lisburn Cricket Club (NCU Premier League, Northern Ireland, UK), having previously played for Central Zone, India Red, India Under-19s, Railways, and Rajasthan Royals. He is a left-handed opening batsman.

In the 2015–16 Deodhar Trophy, Fazal scored a 112-ball 100 for India A in the final against India B. He scored 127 for Rest of India in their successful run-chase of 480 against Mumbai in the 2015–16 Irani Cup.

On 23 May 2016, he was selected in India's squad for their tour of Zimbabwe in June for three One Day Internationals (ODIs) and three Twenty20 Internationals (T20Is). He made his ODI debut on 15 June 2016, scoring 55 not out against Zimbabwe. Under his captainship, Vidharbha won its maiden Ranji Trophy title on 1 January 2018. He was top scorer from his team by scoring 912 runs at an average of 70.15.

In July 2018, he was named as the captain of the India Blue team for the 2018–19 Duleep Trophy. In August 2019, he was named as the captain of the India Green team for the 2019–20 Duleep Trophy.

References

1985 births
Living people
Indian cricketers
India One Day International cricketers
Vidarbha cricketers
Railways cricketers
Central Zone cricketers
India Blue cricketers
India Red cricketers
Rajasthan Royals cricketers
Lisburn Cricket Club players
People from Nagpur
Cricketers from Nagpur